The 1997 BMC election was held on 15 March 1997.

Election results 

Shiv Sena, Indian National Congress and Bhartiya Janta Party were the major political parties in this election.

References 

Brihanmumbai Municipal Corporation
Mumbai
1997 elections in India